The Best Of Nantucket is a compilation of popular songs from North Carolina music group, Nantucket. It covers material from all studio albums by the band from 1978 through 1985.

Track listing
Heartbreaker – 3:53 (from Nantucket, 1978)
Never Gonna Take Your Lies – 3:49 (from Nantucket, 1978)
Real Romance – 4:08 (from Nantucket, 1978)
Born in a Honky Tonk – 3:21 (from Nantucket, 1978)
Quite Like You - 2:29 (from Nantucket, 1978)
Is It Wrong to Rock and Roll - 5:18 (from Your Face or Mine?, 1979)
Pretty Legs - 3:34 (from Nantucket V, 1985)
Time Bomb - 2:59 (from Long Way to the Top, 1980)
California - 4:11 (from Your Face or Mine?, 1979)
Looking You Up - 3:59 (from Nantucket V, 1985)

Personnel
Tommy Redd: Lead & Rhythm Guitars, Acoustic Guitar, Spoon, Lead & Background Vocals
Larry Uzzell: Lead & Background Vocals, Bass Guitar, Trumpet, Harp, Congas, Percussion, Harmonica
Mike Uzzell: Moog Bass, Various Keyboards & Synthesizers, B-3 Organ, Piano, Lead & Background Vocals
Eddie Blair: Tenor & Soprano Saxophones, Keyboards, Piano, Organ, Clavinet, Percussion, Background Vocals
Kenny Soule: Drums & Percussion, Tympani, Background Vocals
Mark Downing: Lead, Slide, Rhythm & Acoustic Guitars, 12-String Guitar, Pedal Guitar
Pee Wee Watson: Bass Guitar, Background Vocals
Richard Gates: Drums, Oberheim DX Drum Machine
David "Thumbs" Johnson: Bass Guitar, Oberheim DX Drum Machine, Background Vocals
Alan Thornton: Lead & Rhytham Guitars, Z-28

References
 Nantucket - A Band Of Desperate Men. Nantucket: Credits. Retrieved Apr. 21, 2007.
 The Daily Reflector. Nantucket: Credits. Retrieved Apr. 21, 2007.

External links
 [ Nantucket on Allmusic]

Nantucket (band) albums
1983 greatest hits albums